Raja Rao Birender Singh (20 February 1921 – 30 September 2009) was a King of erstwhile state of Haryana and an Indian politician. He served first as a minister in the state government of Punjab and then as Chief Minister of Haryana , and also served as a minister in Punjab state, Haryana state and the Union cabinet. He also served as the second speaker (first male speaker) of Haryana state assembly in 1967. He coined an Indian political vocabulary Aya Ram, Gaya Ram to describe the practice of frequently floor-crossing by legislature.

Early life 
Rao was born in 1921 and hails from royal Yaduvanshi Ahir Family of Rewari, Punjab Province (British India), [now Haryana] in British India. He was adopted by Yaduvanshi Ahir personality (King of Rewari state), Rao Balbir Singh. His family is directly descended from Raja Rao Tularam Singh.

Career

East Punjab
The years that Birendra Singh spent at St. Stephen's college were the early years of India's independence. The college was situated in New Delhi, the very hub of political activity, and Birendra Singh was drawn to politics by the environment. The first elections in free India were held in 1952 and Birendra Singh contested as an independent candidate from his native Ahirwal region, of which the city of Rewari is the urban center. He lost that election because there were many twists and turns of the politics in the Ahirwal region.

Birendra Singh then joined the Congress Party. Rather than contest elections to the State Legislative Assembly, he got nominated to the State Legislative Council, which is the upper house of the state legislature. His clipped accent and very progressive views were admired by Nehru and many. His royal background and leadership skills helped Nehru in dealing with more recalcitrant royals from the princely states. Thus, Birendra Singh became a member of the State Legislature of the Indian state of undivided Punjab, known informally as East Punjab, without winning an election. He would serve as a nominated member for two successive terms (a total of 12 years) until 1966. During these years, he was made a minister in the Pratap Singh Kairon government and held charge, at various times, of several important ministries like PWD, Irrigation, Power, Revenue and Consolidation, etc.

Creation of Haryana
When India became independent in 1947, the old province of Punjab was partitioned and East Punjab was retained by India. Several Princely states located on the plains of East Punjab were merged to create the state of PEPSU. Several other princely states in the hills of East Punjab were similarly merged to create the Chief Commissioners' Province of Himachal. The portion which had been directly ruled by the British (rather than by the Maharajas of various princely states) became a third, separate state and received the name Punjab. The Ahirwal region and Rewari lay within this state of Punjab (India), and Birendra Singh was a minister in this state. In the period 1956–66, the three political entities described above were merged and de-merged so that finally, in 1966, the political map of the region as it stands today emerged.

The final step in this process of re-organization was the separation of the Hindi-speaking areas of Punjab into the new state of Haryana, and the creation of the Union Territory of Chandigarh to serve as the common capital of both states. This was accomplished after some acrimony and political maneuvering. Rao Birendra Singh played a prominent role in this process of division. He did so because Ahirwal/Rewari was a Hindi-speaking area in the near vicinity of Delhi and he felt that the Hindi-speaking people of undivided Punjab were not getting their just due in the political dispensation. Therefore, beginning 1962, he spearheaded the campaign for division and achieved success when the state of Haryana was born in November 1966.

Defection from Congress
After the formation of Haryana in November 1966, Bhagwat Dayal Sharma became Haryana's first Chief Minister, and Birendra Singh was elected the first speaker of the Haryana assembly which was a spin-off from the Punjab Assembly. The first-ever poll to Haryana Vidhan Sabha was held in March 1967. Birender Singh was elected a member of the Haryana Legislative Assembly from the Pataudi assembly constituency as Congress Party's candidate. However, he established the Vishal Haryana Party immediately by defecting from Congress with many MLAs. He was appointed Chief Minister of Haryana on 24March 1967, replacing Bhagwat Dayal Sharma with his newly formed VHP assuming power.

But the assembly was dissolved, and Haryana placed under President's rule, in November 1967. Congress won the Vidhan Sabha election in 1968 and Bansi Lal became Chief Minister. Birender Singh's VHP came creditable second to Congress in the election.

He was elected to the 5th Lok Sabha in 1971 from the Mahendragarh on the Vishal Haryana Party ticket.

Later career
In September 1978 he merged this party with the Congress. In 1980, he was re-elected to the 7th Lok Sabha and he played a prominent role in the formation of the Congress Government in the centre. He served in Ninth Cabinet of India as Cabinet Minister of Agriculture (India), Food, Rural development, Irrigation, and Civil supply. In 1984, he was re-elected to the 8th Lok Sabha from Mahendragarh (Lok Sabha constituency) and became a part of the 10th ministry of India under prime minister Rajiv Gandhi. He later resigned from both the Congress party and the Lok Sabha in 1989 on the issue of Bofors scandal. He joined Janata Dal and was elected to 9th Loksabha in 1989, and became Cabinet minister in the Chander Shekhar's Govt. He left active politics after 1996. Rao Birender Singh died on 30 September 2009 in the age of 89.

Army career
Rao Birender Singh also enrolled in the Territorial Army during the Second World War.
 In 1947, he resigned from the Army as a Captain. He came to Rampura and took all the movable and immovable property of Rao Balbir Singh in his possession.
 In the batch of 1949–50, he was selected for Indian Police Service but he did not join that service.
 Again in 1950 to 1951, he joined the Territorial Army as a Commissioned Officer.

Contribution to Rewari

By his efforts, Rewari was made a separate district in 1989. The ruling government was of Chaudhary Om Prakash Chautala who was the Chief Minister.

Education and welfare of Ahirwal areas

Apart from his political service to the Nation Rao Birender Singh also served the backward areas of Ahirwal by establishing many educational institutions like Ahir College Rewari, RBS School-Rewari, Rao Tularam School- Rewari, Rao Tularam Technical College- Delhi. He is the founder of RBS College of Education- Rampura, Rewari.

Death
He died of cardiac arrest in Gurgaon on 30 September 2009.

See also
 List of Rao rulers of Rewari

References

External Notes 
 Dr. Ravindra Singh Yadav & Vijaypal, 1857 ki kranti k purodha: Rao Raja Tularam, 2013, Punit Publication Jaipur, 
 Krantidoot Rao Raja Tularam, 1999, Engg. Anil Yadav, Sarita Book House, Delhi.

1921 births
2009 deaths
India MPs 1971–1977
India MPs 1980–1984
India MPs 1984–1989
India MPs 1989–1991
Chief Ministers of Haryana
Haryana MLAs 1968–1972
Speakers of the Haryana Legislative Assembly
Lok Sabha members from Haryana
People from Rewari district
Leaders of the Opposition in Haryana
Agriculture Ministers of India
Indian National Congress politicians
Janata Dal politicians
Vishal Haryana Party politicians